16:9 (1.7:1) is a widescreen aspect ratio with a width of 16 units and height of 9 units.

Once seen as exotic, since 2009, it has become the most common aspect ratio for televisions and computer monitors, and is also the international standard image format for UHD, HDTV, Full HD, and SD digital television. It has replaced the "fullscreen" 4:3 aspect ratio.

16:9 (1.7:1) (spoken as "sixteen by nine," "sixteen to nine," or simply "sixteen-nine") is the international standard format of Ultra HD, non-HD digital widescreen television and analog widescreen television systems PALplus and Wide-aspect Clear-vision. Japan's Hi-Vision originally started with a 5:3 (1.6:1) ratio but converted when the international standards group introduced a wider ratio of 16 to 9. Many digital video cameras have the capability to record in 16:9, and 16:9 is the only widescreen aspect ratio natively supported by the Ultra HD Blu-ray  standard.  It is also the native aspect ratio of Ultra HD Blu-ray discs, but Ultra HD Blu-ray producers can also choose to show even wider ratios such as 2.00:1 and 2.40:1 within the 16:9 Ultra HD Blu-ray frame by hard matting or adding black bars within the image itself.

History

Dr. Kerns H. Powers, a member of the SMPTE Working Group on High-Definition Electronic Production, first proposed the 16:9 (1.7:1) aspect ratio in 1984, when nobody was creating 16:9 videos. The popular choices in 1980 were 4:3 (based on TV standard's ratio at the time), 15:9 (the European "flat" 1.6:1 ratio), 1.85:1 (the American "flat" ratio) and 2.35:1 (the CinemaScope/Panavision) ratio for anamorphic widescreen.

Powers cut out rectangles with equal areas, shaped to match each of the popular aspect ratios. When overlapped with their center points aligned, he found that all of those aspect ratio rectangles fit within an outer rectangle with an aspect ratio of 1.7:1 and all of them also covered a smaller common inner rectangle with the same aspect ratio 1.77:1. The value found by Powers is exactly the geometric mean of the extreme aspect ratios, 4:3 and 2.35:1, ≈1.77 which is coincidentally close to 16:9. Applying the same geometric mean technique to 16:9 and 4:3 yields an aspect ratio of around 1.5396:1, sometimes approximated as 14:9 (1.5:1), which is likewise used as a compromise between these ratios.

While 16:9 (1.7:1) was initially selected as a compromise format, the subsequent popularity of HDTV broadcast has solidified 16:9 as perhaps the most common video aspect ratio in use. Most 4:3 (1.3:1) and 2.40:1 video is now recorded using a "shoot and protect" technique that keeps the main action within a 16:9 (1.7:1) inner rectangle to facilitate HD broadcast. Conversely it is quite common to use a technique known as center-cutting, to approach the challenge of presenting material shot (typically 16:9) to both an HD and legacy 4:3 audience simultaneously without having to compromise image size for either audience. Content creators frame critical content or graphics to fit within the 1.33:1 raster space. This has similarities to a filming technique called open matte.

In 1993, the European Union instituted the 16:9 Action Plan, to accelerate the development of the advanced television services in 16:9 aspect ratio, both in PALplus (compatible with regular PAL broadcasts) and also in HD-MAC (an early HD format). The Community fund for the 16:9 Action Plan amounted to €228,000,000.

Over a long period in the late 2000s and early 2010s, the computer industry switched from 4:3 to 16:9 as the most common aspect ratio for monitors and laptops. A 2008 report by DisplaySearch cited a number of reasons for this shift, including the ability for PC and monitor manufacturers to expand their product ranges by offering products with wider screens and higher resolutions, helping consumers to more easily adopt such products and "stimulating the growth of the notebook PC and LCD monitor market". By using the same aspect ratio for both TVs and monitors, manufacturing can be streamlined and research costs reduced by not requiring two separate sets of equipment, and since a 16:9 is narrower than a 16:10 panel of the same length, more panels can be created per sheet of glass.

In 2011, Bennie Budler, product manager of IT products at Samsung South Africa, confirmed that monitors capable of  resolutions are not being manufactured anymore. "It is all about reducing manufacturing costs. The new 16:9 aspect ratio panels are more cost-effective to manufacture locally than the previous 16:10 panels".

In March 2011, the 16:9 resolution  became the most common used resolution among Steam's users. By July 2022, 16:9 resolution is preferred by 77% of users (1920x1080 with 67%; 2560 x 1440 with 10%).

Properties
16:9 is the only widescreen aspect ratio natively supported by the DVD format.

Producers can also choose to show even wider ratios such as 1.85:1 and 2.4:1 within the 16:9 DVD frame by hard matting or adding black bars within the image itself. Some films which were made in a 1.85:1 aspect ratio, such as the U.S.-Italian co-production Man of La Mancha and Kenneth Branagh's Much Ado About Nothing, fit quite comfortably onto a 1.7:1 HDTV screen and have been issued as an enhanced version on DVD without the black bars. Also many digital video cameras have the capability to record in 16:9.

Common resolutions

Common resolutions for 16:9 are listed in the table below:

Countries

Europe
In Europe, 16:9 is the standard broadcast format for most digital SD TV channels and all HD broadcasts. Some countries adopted the format for analogue television, first by using the PALplus standard (now obsolete) and then by simply using WSS on normal PAL broadcasts.

Oceania

Asia

Americas

Africa

See also
Display aspect ratio
High-definition television
Display resolution
1080p / 1080i
24p
4:3
14:9
16:10
21:9
Videos with display aspect ratio 16:9 on Commons
PALplus
Clear-Vision
576p
480p

References

External links

 

Picture aspect ratios
High-definition television
Ultra-high-definition television